Benet Rossell (23 October 1937 – 21 August 2016), was a Spanish artist. Drawing, engraving, sign writing, performance, sculpture, film, music, theatre, and poetry were interwoven through Rossell's work, creating an extremely personal conception in which the artwork is a process of constant reinvention. Rossell fashioned a poetics of fragility tinged with irony and a critical spirit, and delved into the micro-worlds that are generally ignored by the absolutist accounts of art history. Though abstract in appearance, his work has a strong narrative component, which modestly and discreetly draws on the artist's own biography.

Biography 
In 1964, Rossell moved to Paris, where he lived for many years. While based there, he travelled widely and spent long periods in other countries, including India and Nepal. Also in Paris at that time were Joan Rabascall, Antoni Miralda and Jaume Xifra, close friends of Rossell with whom, despite differences in professional background, he worked on a number of projects. With them, for instance, Rossell filmed Cerimonials (Ceremonials) (1974), part of the MACBA Collection, celebrations and rituals in which Dorothée Selz participated as well. In Paris, he took film classes with Jean Rouch at the Comité del Film Etnográfico. During those years, Rossell also studied at the Université du Théâtre des Nations, a crucial experience where he first heard of total theatre, understood as an action that brings the concepts of celebration and ritual to bear on the dramatic arts. Rossell himself described these experiences as:
... closer to signic representation than text. I came into contact with languages whose codes I was wholly unfamiliar with, languages without codes for me. I found them fascinating, and they were quite possibly the origin of the language that I have cultivated throughout my artistic trajectory, which comes from a multiplicity of signs, icons, micrographies, calligrams or benigrams without a code, unrepeated and unrepeatable, that coexist, articulate and manifest themselves in a manner that is always unique, always reinvented, and that in the end form a micro-theatre or calligraphic representation of the great micro-theatre of the world. 

Rossell died in Barcelona, Spain on 21 August 2016 from amyotrophic lateral sclerosis.

References 

1937 births
2016 deaths
Spanish artists
Artists from Catalonia
Artists from Paris
Neurological disease deaths in Spain
Deaths from motor neuron disease